2002 Western Conference Finals might refer to:

The Western Conference Finals of the 2002 Stanley Cup Playoffs
The Western Conference Finals of the 2002 NBA Playoffs